Tewksbury may refer to:

Places
Tewksbury, Massachusetts, USA
Tewksbury Township, New Jersey, USA
Tewksbury Heights, Contra Costa County, California, USA
Tewkesbury, Gloucestershire, England
Tewkesbury (UK Parliament constituency)
Borough of Tewkesbury

Other uses
Tewksbury (surname)
12855 Tewksbury, main-belt asteroid

See also
Battle of Tewkesbury (1471)